Belleview, California may refer to:
Belleview, Humboldt County, California
Belleview, Tuolumne County, California